Peter Stillman may refer to:

 Peter Stillman (academic), professor of political science at Vassar College
 Peter Stillman, a character from the Paul Auster novel City of Glass 
 Peter Stillman (Metal Gear), a character from the Metal Gear video game series